Trypeta amanda is a species of tephritid or fruit flies in the genus Trypeta of the family Tephritidae.

Distribution
Myanmar.

References

amanda
Insects described in 1938
Diptera of Asia